Home Care Assistance is an in-home senior care company with locations throughout the United States, Canada and Puerto Rico. Based in San Francisco, California, the company provides non-medical, hourly and live-in care.

The company is notable for its educational Healthy Longevity webinar series, in which it has partnered with various organizations including the Cleveland Clinic, Stanford School of Medicine and the American Society on Aging.

References

External links
 
Companies based in San Francisco